The Pontiac Fiero was a mid-engine sports car manufactured and marketed by Pontiac for model years 1984–1988. Designed by George Milidrag and Hulki Aldikacti as a sports car, it was the first two-seater Pontiac since the 1926 to 1938 coupes, and the first mass-produced mid-engine sports car by an American manufacturer. Progressive technologies incorporated in the Fiero design, included composite panels, unique for their time. Other features included hidden headlamps and integrated stereo speakers in the driver and passenger headrests. The Fiero was discontinued after annual sales fell steadily.

A total of 370,168 units were manufactured over five years of production. At the time, the Fiero's reputation suffered from criticisms over performance, reliability, and safety issues.

The Fiero 2M4 (two-seat, mid-engine, four-cylinder) was on Car and Driver magazine's Ten Best list for 1984. The Fiero was the Official Pace Car of the Indianapolis 500 for 1984.

History and design 
The Fiero was conceived as a small, two-seat sports car with all new suspension and a V6 engine. While General Motors's management were opposed to investing in a second two-seater sports car that might compete with the Corvette, young Pontiac engineers in 1978 were able to sell the Fiero concept to the corporation as a fuel-efficient four-cylinder "commuter car" that just happened to have two seats, rather than a muscle car. When the engineers brought back a running prototype in less than six months, it was given the green light for production. 

They perceived the oil crisis as a market opportunity for a fuel-efficient sporty commuter car. The fuel economy was considered as impressive for a 2.5 L engine of the period, but the three-speed automatic reduced highway mileage to only . With respect to fuel economy, the Fiero appealed to a market niche distinct from the Corvette's.

The Fiero was an unusual design for GM, and stood out from their other products. Its development budget, from design to plant retooling, was 400 million dollars, a small fraction of what GM generally spent on bringing a typical prototype car into production. Pontiac assigned oversight of the Fiero project to Hulki Aldikacti, a Turkish born executive with over twenty years of experience.

Aldikacti's initial challenge was with GM's corporate structure, which split its engineers into two categories: the car engineers who would create blueprints for the car, and manufacturing engineers who would work out the fabrication and assembly issues. Fiero blueprints traveled back and forth between the two engineering branches, resulting in a waste of time and money. Aldikacti was forced to sit the two teams of engineers down next to one another, allowing for no excuses as to why there was "no build" after his design was done. Many modifications in the Fiero's designs were needed to be made for production; for instance, despite his long-standing interest in manufacturing body panels from plastic, Aldikacti consented to metal body pieces, the dies for which were much less costly.

As the prototypes took shape, the exterior lines resembled more of a Ferrari or Porsche than a typical GM car, but the tight budget was taking its toll on the design, particularly on Aldikacti's dream of a high-performance, aluminum-block V6; the cost of developing a new engine would be more than the production of the whole car itself. Instead, Aldikacti was forced to settle for the already manufactured four-cylinder engine GM produced for the Pontiac, the "Iron Duke," nicknamed for its heavy iron block. 

The word Fiero means "very proud", "fierce", "bold", "haughty" "cruel", "severe" in Italian, and "wild", "fierce", or "ferocious" in Spanish. Alternative names considered for the car were Sprint (which had previously been used on a GMC and would later end up being used for a Chevrolet instead), P3000, Pegasus, Fiamma, Sunfire (a name which would later be applied to another Pontiac), and Firebird XP.

Aldikacti's unorthodox design methods and personal manner made him unpopular to most of GM's bureaucracy. He was told by counterparts at other GM divisions three times that his project had been cancelled by corporate management. However, the Fiero project was kept alive at the wishes of certain high-ranked defenders, chief among them William Hoglund, who took over Pontiac in 1980. Hoglund took the reins when the brand's popularity was heavily diluted; Pontiac's cars were said to be bland, outdated, and what customers of the past would buy. In 1983 Hoglund told his top three dozen staffers that Pontiac would rebuild itself with cars that were "exciting" and "different." These terms only described one of Pontiac's cars in their current lineup, Aldikacti's "commuter car". In order to meet the target of building 100,000 cars a year Hoglund's marketing team committed to sell, Hoglund negotiated a deal to reopen a plant once shut down in the heart of Pontiac, Michigan. He and his staff wanted to prove that cooperation between management and labor could be solved without the use of robots on the assembly line, which GM's top executives wanted to use. Hoglund allowed hourly paid workers to name Aldikacti's car while applying this theory; the name "Fiero" was the choice.

A mid-engine layout was originally chosen as a way to reduce both aerodynamic drag and vehicle weight to improve fuel efficiency, and also for its handling, traction, and braking benefits. However, the performance potential of the mid-engine layout was not realized when the Fiero debuted. As a cost-saving measure commonly employed at GM at the time, the tires, brakes, and suspension components were carried over from other GM platforms such as the X and T platforms. As a result, the handling abilities of the Fiero were merely on par with other contemporary sporty coupes 

The public had high expectations for the Fiero with its mid-engine layout and aggressive styling, which resembled exotic mid-engine sports cars like the Ferrari 308GTB. While initially garnering good reviews for its handling (Motor Trend 1984), the Fiero soon received negative reviews from other automotive critics who expected higher performance from a mid-engine two-seater. Despite the criticism, the Fiero sold well and although Pontiac operated three shifts at the factory during 1984, they could not keep up with initial demand.

The sharing of suspension and other components with other GM cars meant the rear suspension and powertrain was virtually identical to that of the Phoenix; the Fiero even included rear tie rod ends attached to a "steering knuckle", although these were hard-mounted to the engine cradle and only used for maintaining the rear tire alignment. The front suspension was derived from the Chevette.

By 1985, the oil crisis was over and demand developed for a Fiero having more engine power and better performance. Pontiac responded by introducing the GT model which included upgraded suspension tuning, wider tires, and a V6 engine having  more than the base four-cylinder.

Finally in 1988, numerous changes were made to the Fiero to bring it in line with its original design. The most significant was a completely redesigned suspension (and parts of the space frame) to realize the potential of the mid-engine layout. The unique suspension included new two-piece brake calipers and upgraded brake rotors. These had been part of the Fiero's initial design, but cost-cutting kept them from being implemented sooner. The available I4 and V6 engines benefited from evolutionary improvements, but the planned availability of turbochargers and newer DOHC engines did not happen before production stopped. In spite of the much-improved car which finally had realized its potential after years of mismanagement, GM ended production after the 1988 model year due to declining sales figures. Bad press and consumer sentiment frequently cited heavy media coverage of Fiero engine fires, as well as the poor reliability and performance of the 1984–1987 models.

Production years

1984

The Fiero began production in August 1983. In an effort to sell the car as economically sensible, GM equipped and sold the Fiero as a commuter car; although the marketing build-up leading to initial release indicated anything but a regular commuter. The car also proved uncomfortable for some drivers because of the lack of power steering.

At the beginning of production the Fiero was only available in Red (M71) and White (M40) colors with Black (M41) and Light Gray Metallic (M14) introduced later, the paint shop was only able to handle four different colors at a time. All 1984 models came with the same 2.5 L I4.

Although sales literature listed only two models available in 1984, there were at least three models available with different optional packages. There was the Fiero Coupe, the Sport Coupe and the SE. The Fiero Coupe, also called "Fuel Economy Leader", came with the MY-8 4-speed manual transaxle that had a 0.73 overdrive top gear along with a high mpg 3.32:1 axle ratio. This gave it an EPA highway/city rating of 50/31 mpg. Air conditioning and automatic transaxle could not be ordered. The starting price for the Fiero Coupe was $7,999. The Fiero Sport Coupe, also referred to as the "base car", came with the M-19 four-speed manual with a 0.81 top gear along with 4.10:1 differential, giving it better acceleration at the cost of fuel economy, 42/26 mpg. An automatic 3-speed transmission, MD-9 Hydramatic 125-C, was available along with A/C which was shared with the Pontiac Sunbird. The starting price was $8,499 ($ in  dollars ) for the Sport Coupe. The top model was the Fiero SE, starting at $9,599 ($ in  dollars ), it included the WS6 handling package along with other trim upgrades.

The marketing included title sponsorship of Daryl Hall & John Oates tour supporting the release of their Big Bam Boom album.  From November 1984 through 1985, each tour venue had Fiero banners and signage above the main stage, new Fieros on display, and Pontiac dealer ticket giveaways. Sales managers at Pontiac dealerships also received a limited edition "Pontiac Fiero Presents Daryl Hall & John Oates" vinyl greatest hits album enticing them to participate in the sponsorship tour. The LP was Rock 'n Soul Part 1. The album cover featured Hall & Oates standing with a red 1984 Fiero SE.

Also, for marketing purposes, the 1984 base model was featured in a 1983 episode of the television show Hardcastle & McCormick.

The 1984 model line included a limited "Indy Pace Car" edition, consisting of an Indianapolis 500-themed option package on SE-model vehicles (a package that was specially reissued in 1985). Approximately 2,000 of these vehicles were sold. The Indy had aero body cladding and new front and rear fascias that would be used on the 1985 GT. Only the four-cylinder engine was available, though a few prototypes were fitted with a unique periscope-style inlet sprouting from the engine compartment and curving up and over the roof. This "periscope" style inlet was used on the three actual Indy Pace Cars used at the 1984 Indianapolis 500. This inlet scoop fed the  Super Duty engine which was only exclusive to the actual Pace Cars. Pontiac's general manager Bill Hoglund nominated John Callies to drive the actual pace car at Indy. Callies was the factory's lead engineer on both the pace car and IMSA programs. The Fiero became the first 4-cylinder car to pace the 500 since a Stoddard-Dayton paced the 1914 race.

The production of the 1984 model ran from July 1983, until almost the end of 1984, this resulted in Pontiac exceeding its first year goal of 80,000 units, which was 28,000 more than the initial estimate and the most two seater cars produced by any US manufacturer at the time.

1985 

The 1985 Fiero did not appear in showrooms until January 1985, with the introduction of the GT model, which looked very similar to the 1984 Indy model without the decals or body color wheels. The three models, and four colors from the previous year were still available and the complaint about insufficient power was addressed, much to the satisfaction of the general public. The V6 was paired with a modified Muncie 4-speed transmission. It could now also be paired with a Japanese-designed Isuzu five-speed transmission as used in the J-body platform, also produced at the Muncie, Indiana plant.

1986

The 1986 Fiero arrived on September 12, 1985, however, the GT model was not originally listed. The previous year's GT became the 1986 SE. The 1986 GT was delayed until January 3, 1986. This was the first time the fastback roofline was offered, sometimes referred to as a "1986½" model, as the new fastback body restyle was not yet ready for release at the start of the model year. Though originally conceived by Pontiac insiders as a new model, possibly called the "GTP" or "GTU," it has been said that GM management at the time felt that using "GTP" or "GTU" suggested a racing car, an image they did not want to promote. Individuals present at the unveiling of the new fastback roof style, in February 1984, at GM's Arizona test track, actually thought it was a new Corvette at first. The Muncie/Getrag 5-speed transaxle, which did not arrive until June 1986, became the standard transaxle in V6 models. Models equipped with the four-cylinder engine received minor changes.  Standard wheels were now 14-inch and the SE receives the GT's aerodynamic front end and rear spoiler.  Stereo speakers were now mounted in the sail panels instead of the headrests.  The new Performance Sound System includes a 5 1/4-inch subwoofer with an amplifier. Red and Light Gray Metallic colors were dropped in favour of Light Gold Metallic (M56), Silver Metallic (M16) and Bright Red (M81). The clutch hydraulic systems were redesigned with new master and slave cylinders and the optional air conditioner gets a lighter compressor and condenser.

1987

1987 saw changes to the front and rear fascias on the "base coupe" with the SE and GT models keeping the same "Aero" nose. The new non-aero noses lost the black bumper pads of the earlier models and had a smoother look. This was the last year for the spin-on oil filter on the four-cylinder. Bright Blue (M21) and Medium Red Metallic (M77) were added and replacing the ribbed black molding was the round style found on the GT models. As a side note, the SE models retained the ribbed molding, and added the aero nose found on the GT. Redesigned headlight motors appeared in 1987. Additionally, starting with the 1987 model Pontiac dealerships offered an upgrade in the form of an "option" that changed the original body to a Pininfarina Ferrari 308-type body, called the Fiero Mera. Corporate Concepts completed the "Mera" transformation and none were sold as kit form. The Mera body change was offered only on new Fieros, sold through Pontiac dealers and is considered a model in its own right. Only 247 Meras were produced by Corporate Concepts before production was halted when Corporate Concepts was sued by Ferrari.

1988

The 1988 Fiero brought a new suspension design, thought by many to have a striking resemblance to those designed by Lotus, which at the time, was about to be acquired by General Motors. The suspension was never a Lotus design though; it was the suspension the Pontiac engineers had designed in the beginning, along with what they learned from the racing program. Up front were revised control arms and knuckles that reduced steering effort and improved the scrub radius. At the rear, a tri-link suspension with all new knuckles was installed. Topping off the package were the new vented disc brakes at all four corners, which addressed braking complaints of road testers. A variable effort electro-hydraulic power steering unit, the same design later found on the GM EV1, was also to be a late addition. This option never made it to production – one reason cited is that models with the prototype power steering were noted as being too loud. The four-cylinder engine received an in-pan oil filter element and balance shaft. A "Formula" option was added, which offered many of the GT features with the standard coupe body, including the  speedometer, WS6 Suspension (which includes offset crosslace wheels) and the rear spoiler. 1988 marked the end of production for the Fiero. Improvements to suspension, brakes, steering, and improvements to both the four-cylinder and V6 engines took the car to a level far beyond the 1984 model that had received much criticism. 1988 was also the only year a yellow exterior color was available as a factory option. On August 16, 1988, the last Fiero rolled off the Pontiac, Michigan, plant line.

The last Fiero built was presented to a GM assembler, and was kept pristine with just over 500 miles on the odometer. It was sold in December 2020 for $90,000.00.

1990 (prototype)

A prototype of the never-produced 1990 Fiero was displayed at the 20th Anniversary show in July 2003, at Fierorama 2005, at the Michigan show in 2006 and most recently at the 25th Anniversary Show in Pontiac, Michigan, in 2008. GM Heritage Center continues storing the 1989/1990 Fiero. Many of the 89/90 coupe prototypes have been demolished in a scrap yard in Australia.

Much of its design influence is apparent in the Fourth Generation Firebird. New engines were proposed for the 1990 model year, from the then new DOHC  "Quad 4" four-cylinder as a base engine to replace the 2.5 L "Iron Duke" to a new 200+ hp DOHC V-6 for the GT models. Even a 231 CID (3.8 L) Buick Turbo V6 powered Fiero is rumored to have been seen at a test track. The single 1990 Fiero GT prototype had an early version of the upcoming DOHC V-6 that would be put into production in the Grand Prix and Lumina Z34 in the early 1990s.

GM cited slumping and unprofitable sales of the Fiero as the reason for its demise following its 5th model year.

Technical features

Engines
The Fiero was available with the  LR8 I4, and  L44 V6

SD4
The SD4 (Super Duty 4-cylinder) was the last in a line of high-performance Pontiac engines. A   SD4 engine powered the 1984 Indy Fiero Pace Car to over  during the race. The SD4 was never available in a production vehicle, however Pontiac's Performance Parts counter had all the SD4 parts available and one could garner a   version and a   version. All 2000 Indy Fiero replicas came with the   Iron Duke engine.

Transmissions

Automatic

All automatic-equipped Fieros were equipped with the three-speed Turbo-Hydramatic 125 with torque converter lockup.
Automatic transmission final drive ratios:

I4
1984–1986: 3.18 (RPO "F75")
1987–1988: 2.84 (RPO "F17")
V6
1985–1986: 3.06 (RPO "?")
1987–1988: 3.33 (RPO "GX3")
THM-125 gear ratios
1st gear: 2.84
2nd gear: 1.60
3rd gear: 1.00
Reverse: 2.07

Manual
All four-speed manual transmissions were built at the Muncie, Indiana, Allison plant. The 1984 production line saw two transmissions, a performance four-speed with a final drive ratio of 4.10, and an economy four-speed with a final drive ratio of 3.32. The V6 on the 1985 model and part of the 1986 production year came with a four-speed with a final drive ratio of 3.65. The lower-geared 4.10 four-speed transmission showed improved acceleration, but sacrificed fuel economy.

Isuzu and Muncie (Getrag) five-speed transmissions were available, depending on model and equipment beginning in 1985 for the Isuzu five-speed which came on four-cylinder cars and in 1986 for the Muncie five-speed which came on V6 equipped cars. The Getrag 282 five-speed is sometimes referred to as the Muncie 282 or the Muncie Getrag 282, as the design was licensed to General Motors for manufacture by Muncie (Getrag never built the 282). This Muncie transmission is the stronger unit, designed for use with the higher output of the V6.

Crash safety
The unique plastic body-on-spaceframe design, helped the Fiero to achieve a NHTSA NCAP frontal crash test rating of five stars, the highest rating available.

According to Hemmings Motor News, the exceedingly sturdy,  space frame consisted of roughly 280 separate galvanized and high-strength steel stampings joined by 3,800 welds and, when assembled with the Fiero's mechanicals, was fully driveable without its skin. The Fiero's body panels are purely cosmetic and carry no structural load. The Fiero was the second safest vehicle sold in America from 1984 to 1988, beaten only by the Volvo 740DL station wagon.

The official crash test scores were as follows:

Head Injury Criterion – 356.5/308.6
Chest Deceleration (G) – 30.9/29.9
Femur Load (LB) – Left 840/800 Right 800/740

The Fiero's technologically advanced spaceframe technology went on to be incorporated in the Saturn S-Series cars and the 1990-96 GM U platform minivans.

Problems and issues
Safety issues escalated rapidly by the summer of 1987, when the fire count for 1984 models reached a rate of 20 fires per month.  Fieros were catching fire at the rate of one for every 508 cars sold, surpassing all other mass-market automobile cars.  Pontiac engineers knew about the problems early on: one wrote an urgent memo dated October 6, 1983, to report that two Fieros had suddenly caught fire during test drives. This was only 3 months after the production of the Fiero began. It was first thought to be caused by antifreeze leaking out of badly installed hoses but in reality it was defective connecting rods. After one meeting with the Saginaw foundry manager, he wrote that "60 percent to 90 percent of the rods produced do not exhibit defects." This means at least every 1 out of 10 rods produced were defective and possibly 4 out of 10 were also defective. The Associated Press quoted the National Highway Traffic Safety Administration as saying it had "...received 148 complaints regarding Pontiac Fieros catching fire including reports of six injuries. Low levels of engine oil may cause a connecting rod to break, allowing oil to escape and come into contact with engine parts. The oil would catch fire when it contacted the exhaust manifold or hot exhaust components." David Hudgens, a GM spokesman in Detroit said "if you ran out of oil, and then that coupled with some aggressive driving, perhaps, and maybe not changing the oil very often, you end up with a broken rod, and that's where the connecting rod came in; it is still the owner's responsibility to check the oil."

The Pontiac division said in a 1988 press release that "GM tests have shown that running these 1984 cars with low engine oil level can cause connecting rod failure which may lead to an engine compartment fire. Pontiac is aware of 260 fires attributable to the condition, along with ten reported minor injuries."

In popular culture

Currently the Fiero has a cult following of owners and customizers. While all Fiero models are considered to be collectible, the 1988 model year is particularly sought after by collectors due to its limited production numbers and vastly improved underpinnings. Because of an abundance of replacement parts available from other General Motors vehicles, there are many upgrades that can be done to improve performance and reliability of the cars. Additionally, a multitude of different General Motors engines have been installed by enthusiasts, from the Quad-4 engine to the Chevrolet small-block V8 to the Cadillac 4.9 L and Northstar V8s. The GM 3800 Supercharged is also a very popular choice, as well as the 3.4 L found in the 1993, 1994, and 1995 Camaro/Firebird. One shop in particular that pioneered and now specializes in V8 installations has even gone so far as to install the famed Z06 Corvette powerplant, the 505 horsepower LS7, into a Fiero. Installation of the 4.9 L V8 or smaller engines is possible with few modifications to the car itself, because Fiero prototypes were tested with a similar small aluminum V8 prior to production. As a result, the engine bay is large enough to accommodate engines of that size.

The Fiero is also popular for being modified into Lamborghini and Ferrari replicas along with other custom kit car modifications.

Legacy
When the Fiero's 1984 model was introduced, it played a major role in building the "excitement" image that the Pontiac Division Motor Company wanted to establish in its car buyers.  This car pioneered new concepts such as the participation of autoworkers in production methods as well as new materials provide a showcase as the first production car in the world to use a space/frame chassis with a separate body shell composed of SMC Sheet Molded Composite. According to Design News, Pontiac engineers pointed out that the Fiero experience helped the company to develop the sporty look of the Grand Am and Sunbird, as well as "road car" features in the once-traditional Bonneville and Grand Prix. Such Fiero advances as the composite skin lived on in new GM products like the Saturn.

Scale models

Several diecast model manufacturers have replicated the Fiero in various scales. Hot Wheels released a 1984 Fiero 2M4 under many paint schemes. Matchbox and Majorette also released Fiero models during the car's heyday. Monogram has released and re-released a 1985 Fiero GT model (the re-release is currently available). In recent years, a large 1:18 die-cast model of a 1985 GT was available in red and silver colors. In 2007 the Motor Max toy company began making small die-cast Fiero GT toys under the "American Graffiti" and "Fresh Cherries" lines. Select Wal-Mart locations sold a special "Since '68" Fiero made by Hot Wheels, which uses the original 1984 mold with a new paint job. The Kenner toy line M.A.S.K. had a black Fiero GT that converted into a glider craft and three wheeled chopper, called "Fireforce." Tonka's toy line Gobots included a character, "Sparky", who converted into a 1984 Fiero 2M4 (called a "P-car" on the packaging). Also worth mention is the Transformers character Punch/Counterpunch, a spy who converts into a vehicle looking similar to a 1985 Fiero GT, but modified to avoid trademark issues. Other plastic-kit display models were released by MPC-ERTL in 1:25 scale. One was a 1984 2M4 kit 10883, the other was 1987 (essentially identical to 1986) GT kit 6401.

References

Further reading
 Paul Ingrassia, and Joseph B. White, Comeback: the fall and rise of the American automobile industry (1995) pp. 99–110 online.

External links

FieroHub The Pontiac Fiero registry.

Rear mid-engine, rear-wheel-drive vehicles
Fiero
Sports cars
Coupés
Motor vehicles manufactured in the United States
Cars introduced in 1984
Cars discontinued in 1988